Dominik Dinga (born 7 April 1998) is a Serbian professional footballer who plays as a centre-back for Ordabasy.

Club career

Vojvodina
Dinga was a member of Hajduk Kula until summer 2014, when he moved to Vojvodina. After season with youth team, he started his senior career from 2015–16 season. He scored his first goal, in first friendly match for the first team. Dinga made his official debut for Vojvodina's senior team in first qualifying round for UEFA Europa League, in pair with Igor Đurić in first match against MTK, ended with 0:0 result. He also made his Serbian SuperLiga in 1st fixture, against Čukarički, when he was substituted in at the half-time for Igor Đurić. On 19 February 2016, Dinga terminated the contract with Vojvodina.

Ural
Dinga signed a long-term contract with the Russian club FC Ural Sverdlovsk Oblast on 8 April 2016. He would not be able to play for the club in the 2015–16 Russian Premier League games as the transfer window was already closed at the time. He made his official debut for club in the 2nd fixture match of the 2016–17 Russian Premier League, against Rostov, played on 7 August 2016.

After remaining on the bench in all the 2022 Ural games after returning from loan, Dinga was released from his contract with Ural by mutual consent on 17 June 2022.

Partizan
On 14 June 2019, he joined FK Partizan on loan.

Dinamo Minsk
On 15 February 2020, he joined Dinamo Minsk on loan till the end of season. His loan was extended for the 2021 season. He returned to Ural at the end of the 2021 season.

International career
Dinga joined Vojvodina, as a captain of Serbia U17 national selection. Previously, he was also a member of Under 16 national team. In August 2016, Dinga was called into Serbia U19 squad for memorial tournament "Stevan Vilotić - Ćele", where he debuted as a captain in opening match against United States. In 2nd match of the same tournament, he scored a goal against France. After Serbia beat Israel in the final match, Dinga was nominated for the best player of the tournament. Dinga also scored a goal in a match against Moldova, played on 9 November 2016.

Personal life
Dinga was born in Novi Sad to an ethnic Slovak family but he was raised in Pivnice, Bačka Palanka.

Career statistics

Club

References

External links
 Dominik Dinga stats at utakmica.rs
 
 
 

1998 births
Living people
Footballers from Novi Sad
Slovaks of Vojvodina
Association football defenders
Serbian footballers
Serbia youth international footballers
FK Vojvodina players
FC Ural Yekaterinburg players
FK Partizan players
FC Dinamo Minsk players
FC Ordabasy players
Russian Premier League players
Serbian SuperLiga players
Serbian expatriate footballers
Serbian expatriate sportspeople in Russia
Serbian expatriate sportspeople in Belarus
Serbian expatriate sportspeople in Kazakhstan
Expatriate footballers in Russia
Expatriate footballers in Belarus
Expatriate footballers in Kazakhstan